Taenaris catops, the silky owl, is a butterfly of the family Nymphalidae. It is found in New Guinea and surrounding islands.

The wingspan is 75–95 mm.

The larvae feed on Cordyline terminalis, Musa species, Areca catechu and Caryota rumphiana.

References

Taenaris